White Sunday is the debut solo album of New Zealand hip-hop artist, Mareko released in 2003.  A limited edition of the album was released in 2006. The name is a reference to a Samoan holiday that happens on the second Sunday in October. The album peaked at #4 on the New Zealand album charts.

Song information
In March 2006, a double CD package was released which not only included the White Sunday album but also included a second disc that had all instrumentals from White Sunday as well as two bonus tracks produced by Mareko.

Track listing
2003 edition
Espionage
Oh Sh** featuring Psycho Les of the Beatnuts
Street Rap featuring Inspectah Deck
Mareko (Here To Stay)
Why Is That?
White Sunday Sermon
Legacy
City Line
Big Dummy featuring Celph Titled
Don't Need Protection featuring Scram Jones and Roc Raida of the X-Ecutioners
Suburban Legend
Let Y'all Know featuring J-Ro and E-Swift of tha liks
This Is Me
My Lady
Major Flavour featuring Sadat X and DJ Sir-Vere
Stop, Drop and Roll featuring the Deceptikonz
2006 limited edition

Disc one

Espionage
Oh Sh** featuring Psycho Les
Street Rap featuring Inspectah Deck
Mareko (Here To Stay)
Why Is That?
White Sunday Sermon
Legacy
City Line
Big Dummy featuring Celph Titled
Don't Need Protection featuring Scram Jones and Roc Raida
Suburban Legend
Let Y'all Know featuring J-Ro and E-Swift
This Is Me
My Lady
Major Flavour featuring Sadat X and DJ Sir-Vere
Stop, Drop and Roll featuring the Deceptikonz

Disc two

Espionage (Instrumental) 
Oh Sh** (Instrumental)
Street Rap (Instrumental)
Mareko (Here To Stay) (Instrumental)
Why Is That? (Instrumental)
White Sunday Sermon (Instrumental)
Legacy (Instrumental)
City Line (Instrumental)
Big Dummy (Instrumental)
Don't Need Protection (Instrumental)
Suburban Legend (Instrumental)
Let Y'all Know (Instrumental)
This Is Me (Instrumental)
My Lady (Instrumental)
Major Flavour (Instrumental) 
Stop, Drop and Roll (Instrumental)

Bonus tracks

CRUNCH! featuring Deceptikonz99 Bottles''

References

2003 debut albums
Mareko albums
Albums produced by Scram Jones